2046 is a 2004 romantic drama film written, produced and directed by Wong Kar-wai. An international co-production between Hong Kong, France, Italy, China and Germany, it is a loose sequel to Wong's films Days of Being Wild (1990) and In the Mood for Love (2000). It follows the aftermath of Chow Mo-wan's unconsummated affair with Su Li-zhen in 1960s Hong Kong and includes elements of science fiction.

Plot

There are four main story arcs, their approximate order listed below, though typical of Wong's films, they are presented in pieces and in non-chronological order. For concision, knowledge of Days of Being Wild and In the Mood for Love is assumed, though not absolutely necessary.

2046 arc part I

In the future, a rail network connects Earth. Lonely souls try to reach a mysterious room called 2046; nothing ever changes there so there is never loss or sadness. No one has ever returned from 2046 except Japanese man Tak.

"All Memories Are Traces of Tears"

Returning to Hong Kong after years in Singapore, Chow becomes a suave ladies' man to cover up his pain from losing Su. On Christmas Eve, Chow meets Lulu and takes her home but accidentally keeps her room key. As he leaves, he notices that her room number is 2046. Upon returning the key, the landlord informs him that the room is not available due to renovations and offers the adjacent 2047. Chow later learns that Lulu was stabbed in 2046 the night before by a jealous boyfriend.

After finishing renovation of 2046, the landlord asks Chow if he wants to move in. He has now gotten used to 2047 and stays there.

Wang Jing-wen and Wang Jie-wen arc part I

The landlord's daughter Jing-wen moves into 2046; she is involved with a Japanese man that her father opposes. Eventually, Jing-wen breaks up with him, suffers a breakdown, and is institutionalized. The next tenant is Jing-wen's younger sister Jie-wen who seduces Chow to no avail.

A short time later, Chow runs into financial difficulties so he starts writing a series called 2046 about heartsick individuals trying to find the mysterious 2046. Nearly all of the characters in 2046 are based on people Chow has met, such as Su, Lulu, and Jing-wen.

Bai Ling arc part I

The 3rd to move into 2046 is Bai Ling, implied to be a nightclub girl and high-class prostitute seeking a long-term relationship. On the next Christmas Eve, Bai runs into Chow just after she is dumped by her boyfriend before they were to go to Singapore. He intrigues her with his experiences in Singapore and they become friends, but their initially platonic relationship soon becomes sexual. Chow wants to keep it strictly physical, continuing to pick up other prostitutes. To compromise, Bai makes him pay $10 each time he stays over. However, Bai realizes that she has feelings for Chow and asks him to stop seeing other women. Chow refuses so Bai breaks off with him, starts seeing men solely for money, and moves out of 2046.

Jing-wen part II

After Bai moves out, Jing-wen moves back in from the mental hospital but is still depressed over the loss of her ex. Her ex wants to reconcile with her but she refuses due to her father. Jing-wen helps Chow with his writing; he remarks that this is his happiest period post-Su. He develops feelings for her and makes some weak attempts but nothing develops since she still loves her ex.

One day Jing-wen asks Chow if some things in life never change. He answers by writing a story called 2047 in which a Japanese man falls in love on the trip home from 2046. While he initially tried to base the story on Jing-wen's ex, he realises that the story is ultimately about himself.

2046 arc part II

Tak (portrayed by Jing-wen's ex) tries to leave 2046 because he lost his love there. On the trip, he falls for one of the train's gynoid assistants (portrayed by Jing-wen), but it never responds to him. Tak realises that it is in love with someone else and finds the strength to leave the train and 2046. Completing the story marks a turning point in Chow's recovery.

Jing-wen part III

Next Christmas, Chow finds out Jing-wen still misses her ex so he lets her call him in his office. While he has feelings for her and could have taken advantage of the situation, he is happy that he did the "right thing." Soon after, Jing-wen moves to Japan and gets engaged.

While still depressed over the loss of Jing-wen, Chow runs into Lulu again as she confronts another woman for sleeping with her current boyfriend. Chow thinks Lulu is likely to forever remain in the past, though she seems content with her misery, and he resolves to get over Su.

Bai arc part II

Some time later, Bai calls Chow and they go out to dinner. She informs Chow that she plans to leave for Singapore and asks him for a reference and plane fare. Bai also asks where he was last Christmas, as she stopped by then, hoping to see him. Chow had gone back to Singapore to find another woman named Su Li-zhen.

Su Arc

Chow met the second Su when he first arrived in Singapore and was grieving over the first Su. The second Su agreed to help him win back his money so he could return to Hong Kong. They became lovers but unless he beat her in a "high-card" draw, she would never reveal her identity. After she won back his money, he asked her to go with him. She challenged him to a draw, which he again lost. Chow speculated that she also had a troubled past.

Initially heartbroken, Chow realizes after completing 2047 that the second Su did not go with him because he would have tried to recapture the past by looking for elements of the first Su in her. When Chow returned to Singapore to visit her the second time, he did not find her. He inquired about her whereabouts and theorized that she either returned to Cambodia or was killed.

Bai arc part III

The night before Bai leaves for Singapore, Chow dines with her again. She insists on paying for dinner after getting paid by a client and  hands him a stack of money, each $10 bill representing a night they spent together. After dinner, Chow walks her back to her apartment. Grasping his hands at the door, she begs him to spend the night once more. He reminds her of a question she asked him, whether there was anything he wouldn't lend, and now he realizes that there is one thing he won't lend to anyone. Chow leaves in a taxi, staring emptily into space. He never saw her again.

Cast
 Tony Leung Chiu-Wai as Chow Mo-wan, the main character and narrator. A journalist and writer, he is the same character, played by the same actor, as in In the Mood for Love. He also appears in a silent cameo at the very end of Days of Being Wild.
 Maggie Cheung as Su Li-zhen, the woman Chow Mo-wan loved most. She appears only in flashback.  See In the Mood for Love.
 Gong Li as Another Su Li-zhen. Presented as a "professional gambler" and nicknamed "Black Spider", she said that she was from Phnom Penh. Chow Mo-wan met her in Singapore.
 Wang Sum as
 Mr. Wang, the hotel owner. He had taken singing lessons in Harbin, China.
 The captain of the train to (or from) 2046.

 Faye Wong as
 Wang Jing-wen, the first daughter of Mr. Wang, the hotel owner. She was in love with a Japanese man, a relationship that her father opposed strongly.
 A Gynoid in the train to (or from) 2046.
 Takuya Kimura as
 A Japanese man, sent to Hong Kong for a while by his company. He is Wang Jing-wen's boyfriend.
 Tak, a passenger of the train to (or from) 2046.
 Dong Jie as Wang Jie-wen. The second daughter of Mr. Wang, the hotel owner.
 Carina Lau as
 Mimi/Lulu.  See Days of Being Wild.
 A gynoid in the train to (or from) 2046.
 Chang Chen as
 The drummer boyfriend of Mimi/Lulu.
 A passenger of the train to (or from) 2046.
 Zhang Ziyi as Bai Ling. A beautiful cabaret girl who lived in room 2046 in the Oriental Hotel, and a lover of Chow Mo-wan.
 Siu Ping-lam as Ah Ping, a colleague and friend of Chow Mo-wan.
 Bird McIntyre as Bird
 Benz Kong as Brother Hoi
 Berg Ng as Mo-wan's party friend
 Akina Hong as a party girl

Production
It took four years to complete the film. During that time, production was closed because of the SARS epidemic in March 2003.

It was picked up by Sony Pictures Classics for distribution in the United States, and was released on 5 August 2005.

Title
2046 is the number of the hotel room in In the Mood for Love in which Chow Mo-wan (Tony Leung Chiu-wai) and Su Li-zhen (Maggie Cheung) meet to write their kung fu novel serial. It is the number of a hotel room occupied by Lulu, and later by Bai Ling at the Oriental Hotel, while Mo-Wan's room number is 2047.

Chow writes science fiction stories, in which 2046 is a popular year and place to which people travel through time. The stories are titled 2046 and later 2047 (in collaboration with Wang Jing-wen).

The year 2046 has its own significance for Hong Kong, as it is 49 years after the handover of Hong Kong by the British on 1 July 1997. At the time of handover, the Mainland government promised fifty years of self-regulation for the former British colony. The year 2046 references the moment before Hong Kong's special, self-regulated status ends.

Critical reception
On review aggregator Rotten Tomatoes, the film has an approval rating of 86% based on 119 reviews, with an average rating of 7.40/10. The website's critical consensus reads, "Director Wong Kar-Wai has created in 2046 another visually stunning, atmospheric, and melancholy movie about unrequited love and loneliness." On Metacritic, the film has a weighted average score of 78 out of 100 based on 34 critic reviews, indicating "generally favorable reviews".

One of the most positive reviews came from Manohla Dargis in The New York Times, who called the film "an unqualified triumph", and praised Zhang Ziyi's performance, saying: "Ms. Zhang's shockingly intense performance burns a hole in the film that gives everything, including all the other relationships, a sense of terrific urgency." Dargis also describes the film:"Routinely criticized for his weak narratives, Mr. Wong is one of the few filmmakers working in commercial cinema who refuse to be enslaved by traditional storytelling. He isn't the first and certainly not the only one to pry cinema from the grip of classical narrative, to take a pickax to the usual three-act architecture (or at least shake the foundation), while also dispatching with the art-deadening requirements (redemption, closure, ad nauseam) that have turned much of Big Hollywood into a creative dead zone. Like some avant-garde filmmakers and like his contemporary, Hou Hsiao-hsien of Taiwan, among precious few others these days, Mr. Wong makes movies, still a young art, that create meaning through visual images, not just words." 

In Premiere, Glenn Kenny gave the film four stars and ranked it as one of the ten best films of 2005:"Insanely evocative '60s-style landscapes and settings share screen space with claustrophobic futuristic CGI metropolises; everyone smokes and drinks too much; musical themes repeat as characters get stuck in their own self-defeating modes of eternal return. A puzzle, a valentine, a sacred hymn to beauty, particularly that of Ziyi Zhang, almost preternaturally gorgeous and delivering an ineffable performance, and a cynical shrug of the shoulders at the damned impermanence of it all, 2046 is a movie to live in."

Said Ty Burr of The Boston Globe:"Is it worth the challenge? Of course it is. Wong stands as the leading heir to the great directors of post-WWII Europe: His work combines the playfulness and disenchantment of Godard, the visual fantasias of Fellini, the chic existentialism of Antonioni, and Bergman's brooding uncertainties. In this film, he drills further into an obsession with memory, time, and longing than may even be good for him, and his world reflects and refracts our own more than may be comfortable for us. Love hurts in 2046, but it's the only way anybody knows they're alive."

Daniel Eagan of Film Journal International:"it's clear his [Wong Kar-wai] skills and interests have no match in today's cinema.  Whatever his motives, Wong has assembled a remarkable team for this film. The cinematography, production design and editing combine for a mood of utter languor and decadence. Leung Chiu-wai continues his string of outstanding roles, while pop singer Wong achieves a gravity missing from her earlier work...it's Zhang who is the real surprise here...her performance puts her on a level with the world's best actresses." 

One of the less enthusiastic reviews came from Roger Ebert who, in the Chicago Sun-Times, gave the film a mildly-negative 2½ stars out of a possible four and a "marginal thumbs down" on the television show Ebert & Roeper."2046 arrived at the last minute at Cannes 2003, after missing its earlier screenings; the final reel reportedly arrived at the airport almost as the first was being shown. It was said to be unfinished, and indeed there were skeletal special effects that now appear in final form, but perhaps it was never really finished in his mind. Perhaps he would have appreciated the luxury that Woody Allen had with Crimes and Misdemeanors; he looked at the first cut of the film, threw out the first act, called the actors back and reshot, focusing on what turned out to be the central story. Watching 2046, I wonder what it could possibly mean to anyone not familiar with Wong's work and style. Unlike In the Mood for Love, it is not a self-contained film, although it's certainly a lovely meander."

The official journal of the Film Society of Lincoln Center, Film Comment'''s 2005 end-of-the-year film critics' poll, placed the film as the second best film of that year, with 668 points. 2046 was called the best film of 2005 by Michael Atkinson (The Village Voice), Daryl Chin (Journal of Performance and Art), Josef Brown (Vue Weekly), Sean Burns (Philadelphia Weekly), Will Sloan (The Martingrove Beacon), and Justine Elias (The Guardian), and was ranked among the top ten best films of the year by Manohla Dargis (The New York Times), Richard Corliss (Time Magazine), Same Adams (Philadelphia City Paper), Leslie Camhi (The Village Voice), Jason Anderson (eye Weekly), Gary Dretzka (Movie City News), Godfrey Cheshire (The Independent Weekly), Ty Burr (The Boston Globe), Liza Bear (indieWIRE), Edward Crouse (The Village Voice), Jeffrey M. Anderson (The San Francisco Examiner), John DeFore (Austin American Statesman), Brian Brooks (indieWIRE), Chris Barsanti (Filmcritic.com), F.X. Feeney (L.A. Weekly), David Ehrenstein (New Times), J. Hoberman (The Village Voice), Robert Horton (Everett Herald), Bilge Ebiri (Nerve), Eugene Hernandez (indieWIRE)

Box office and distribution2046 opened in North America on 5 August 2005, where it grossed US$113,074 on four screens ($28,268 average). In Wong Kar-wai's home country of Hong Kong, 2046 earned a total of US$778,138. It went on to gross a total of $1,444,588 in North America, playing at 61 venues at its widest release. Its total worldwide box office gross is US$19,271,312.

Sony Pictures Home Entertainment released the film on DVD on 26 December 2005. Since then, it has yet to be re-released or restored in the United States. A region free Blu-ray was released by EOS Entertainment on 17 September 2014 in South Korea, as part of a Wong Kar Wai boxset.

The film finally debuted on Blu-ray in the United States on March 23, 2021 in a set compiled by the Criterion Collection entitled "World of Wong Kar-wai" and includes this film alongside 6 of his other films.

 Accolades 
In April 2004, the film was nominated for the Golden Palm at the 2004 Cannes Film Festival.

In November 2004, it won awards for Best Art Direction and Best Original Film Score at the Golden Horse Film Festival in Taiwan. The same year, it also won the European Film Award for Best Non-European Film, the Best Foreign Language Film award at the San Sebastián International Film Festival, and was voted Best Foreign Language Film by the New York Film Critics Circle, while taking second place at the Boston Society of Film Critics and Los Angeles Film Critics Association Awards in the same category.

In March 2005, it was nominated in numerous categories at the Hong Kong Film Awards, winning Best Actor (Tony Leung), Best Actress (Zhang Ziyi), Best Cinematography (Christopher Doyle), Best Costume Design and Make-Up, Best Art Direction, and Best Original Film Score (Shigeru Umebayashi).

Music
Original music:
 Shigeru Umebayashi – "2046 Main Theme" (scenes 5, 15 and closing credits), "2046 Main Theme (Rumba Version)" (scene 25), "Interlude I" (scenes 29, 38), "Polonaise" (scenes 37, 43), "Lost", "Long Journey" (Scenes 40–41), "Interlude II" (Scene 30), "2046 Main Theme" (With Percussion, Train Remix)

Adopted music:
 Peer Raben – "Dark Chariot" (Scenes 7–9, 12–13) from Rainer Werner Fassbinder's Querelle (1982) and "Sisyphos at Work" (Scene 4) from Fassbinder's film The Third Generation (1979)
 Xavier Cugat – "Siboney" (scenes 6 (instrumental), 17, 19, 24), "Perfidia" (scenes 10, 39)
 Dean Martin – "Sway" (scene 18)
 Georges Delerue – "Julien et Barbara" from François Truffaut's Vivement Dimanche! (1983) (scenes 21–23, 42)
 Connie Francis – "Siboney"
 Vincenzo Bellini and Felice Romani – "Casta Diva" from Bellini's Norma, performed by Angela Gheorghiu and the London Symphony Orchestra, directed by Evelino Pidò – recorded in 2000 (scenes 11, 14, 28, 36) and Bellini's Il pirata (scenes 16, 26)
 Zbigniew Preisner – "Decision" from Thou shalt not kill, part 5 of Krzysztof Kieślowski's The Decalogue Secret Garden – "Adagio" with David Agnew (cor anglais) (scenes 3, 27, 31, 34)
 Nat King Cole and the Nat King Cole Trio – "The Christmas Song" (1946 version with strings) (scenes 20, 35)

See also
 List of films set in Hong Kong
 List of Hong Kong films
 List of TV and films with critiques of Chinese Communist Party
 Six Days''

References

External links

 
 Official website, by Jet Tone Films Ltd (Hong Kong)
 
 
 
 
 2046 at LoveHKFilm.com

2004 films
2004 romantic drama films
2004 science fiction films
2000s Cantonese-language films
2000s Chinese films
2000s French films
2000s German films
2000s Hong Kong films
2000s Italian films
2000s Japanese-language films
2000s Mandarin-language films
2000s science fiction drama films
Chinese romantic drama films
Chinese science fiction drama films
European Film Awards winners (films)
Films about journalists
Films directed by Wong Kar-wai
Films scored by Shigeru Umebayashi
Films set in the 1960s
Films set in 2046
Films set in the future
French romantic drama films
French science fiction drama films
German romantic drama films
German science fiction drama films
Hong Kong New Wave films
Hong Kong romantic drama films
Hong Kong science fiction films
Italian romantic drama films
Italian science fiction drama films
Science fiction romance films